Karen Dewis (born 19 September 1962) is a Canadian former professional tennis player.

Tennis career
Dewis featured on the WTA Tour in the 1980s. She reached the final qualifying round at the 1980 Wimbledon Championships and won her first round match at the 1984 Borden Classic.

Between 1980 and 1984 she appeared in a total of six ties for the Canada Federation Cup team. Her only singles win came against Mexico's Alejandra Vallejo, in addition to doubles wins over Yugoslavia and Chile.

A varsity tennis player for the UCLA Bruins, Dewis was a gold medalist for Canada at the 1983 World University Games in Edmonton, partnering Jill Hetherington.

See also
List of Canada Fed Cup team representatives

References

External links
 
 
 

1962 births
Living people
Canadian female tennis players
Medalists at the 1983 Summer Universiade
Universiade gold medalists for Canada
Universiade medalists in tennis
UCLA Bruins women's tennis players